The 2018 Asian Eastern Zonal Women's Volleyball Championship was the 11th edition of the AVC Eastern Zonal Women's Volleyball Championship, the volleyball championship of East Asia. It was held in Zhangjiagang, China from 10 to 15 July 2016.

Japan won the title for the fifth time, defeating China in the final, 3–0. Chinami Furuya was elected the most valuable player.

Pools composition

Venue
 Zhangjiagang Sports Center, Zhangjiagang, China

Preliminary round
 All times are China standard time (UTC+08:00).

Pool A

|}

|}

Pool B

|}

|}

Final round
 All times are China standard time (UTC+08:00).

5th–8th places

5th–8th semifinals

|}

7th place match

|}

5th place match

|}

Final four

Semifinals

|}

3rd place match

|}

Final

|}

Final standing

Awards
MVP:  Chinami Furuya
Best Coach:   Ken Nemoto

References

External links
 Official AVC website

East Asia Volleyball Championship
2018 in Chinese women's sport
2018 in women's volleyball
International volleyball competitions hosted by China